Summit Lake is a lake in Murray County, in the U.S. state of Minnesota.

Summit Lake was named for its lofty elevation.

See also
List of lakes in Minnesota

References

Lakes of Minnesota
Lakes of Murray County, Minnesota